Johann Gottfried Schädel was a German-born Baroque architect who worked in the Russian Empire, especially in St. Petersburg, Oranienbaum and Kiev.

Schaedel was born in 1680 in Wandesbek, Duchy of Holstein, Holy Roman Empire (now part of Hamburg).

In 1713, Prince Alexander Menshikov paid him 400 Reichsthaler (384 rubles) to move to Saint Petersburg with his family. After Menshikov's fall from grace, Schaedel settled in Moscow where he worked in tandem with the Italian artist Francesco Bartolomeo Rastrelli.

In 1731, Schädel accepted an invitation from the Archbishop of Kiev Rafail Zaborovsky and moved to Kiev (now Kyiv, Ukraine), where he designed the great belltowers of Kiev Pechersk Lavra and Sophia Cathedral, the Klov Palace (for the royal family Romanov) and other notable buildings which altered the city's skyline.

Schädel received no new commissions after 1744 and died in Kiev in poverty in 1752.

In 1995, the Ukrainian film director Valentyn Sokolovsky created a documentary about Schaedel for the National Television Company of Ukraine.

Notable buildings 

 Menshikov Palace
 Great Lavra Bell Tower
 Klov Palace

External links
 Johann Gottfried Schädel at Ukraine, the History of Great Nation.

1680 births
1752 deaths
People from Wandsbek
German Baroque architects
Russian Baroque architects
Architects from the Russian Empire
Ukrainian Baroque architects
Architects from Hamburg